Maple Township may refer to one of the following places in the United States:

 Maple Township, Ida County, Iowa
 Maple Township, Cowley County, Kansas
 Maple Township, Cass County, Minnesota
 Maple Township, Dodge County, Nebraska